General Sir John Aitchison GCB (25 April 1779 – 12 May 1875) was a British Army officer.

Military career
Aitchison was commissioned at 16 into the 3rd Regiment of Foot Guards, later to be the Scots Guards. He took part in the crossing of the River Douro during the Peninsular War. He fought at the Battle of Talavera in July 1809, the Battle of Bussaco in September 1810 and the Battle of Salamanca in July 1812 before seeing action at the Battle of Vitoria in June 1813, the Siege of San Sebastián in July 1813 and the Battle of Nivelle in November 1813. He also fought at the Battle of the Nive in December 1813 and Battle of Bayonne in April 1814 and went on to become Major General on the staff of the Madras Presidency in 1845.

He was colonel of the 72nd Regiment, Duke of Albany's Own Highlanders from 1851 to 1870 and of the Scots Fusilier Guards from 1870 to his death. He was promoted full general on 30 July 1860.

He died in 1875 and was buried at Kensal Green Cemetery in a mausoleum west of the main chapel. He had married Ellen Elizabeth and had one son, Archibald John Aitchison.

References

1779 births
1875 deaths
British Army generals
Burials at Kensal Green Cemetery
Knights Grand Cross of the Order of the Bath
Scots Guards officers
People from Tranent
British Army personnel of the Peninsular War
Military personnel from East Lothian